Silvio Baldini (born 11 September 1958 in Massa) is an Italian association football manager, last in charge of Serie B club Perugia.

Career

Early years 
Born in Massa but hailing from nearby Carrara, Baldini started his coaching career in 1984 at the age of 26 with Bagnone, an amateur Seconda Categoria team which he led to immediate promotion in his debut year. In 1988, he became assistant coach of Massese.

In 1989, he was then appointed at the helm of Promozione team Forte dei Marmi, which he led to promotion in 1991. After a single season with Viareggio, he finally obtained a professional coaching license and returned to Massese, this time as head coach, in 1992. Following that experience, he served as head coach for Serie C1 clubs Siena (1993-1995) and Carrarese (1995-1997).

Chievo and Brescia 
In 1997 Baldini was chosen to fill the Chievo Verona head coaching position, on what was his first Serie B job, leading the gialloblu to a final seventh place in the league table. He then moved next year to Brescia in 1998.

Empoli 
In 1999 he moved back to his native Tuscany as the new head coach of Serie B club Empoli. In 2002, Empoli ended in fourth place, being therefore promoted to Serie A.

On his Serie A debut year, Baldini led Empoli, widely tipped for relegation, to an impressive 12th place in the Italian top flight.

Palermo 
Baldini's successes at Empoli led to interest from ambitious Serie B club Palermo, which was acquired by Maurizio Zamparini just one year earlier. Assigned with the goal to guide the Rosanero to immediate promotion to Serie A, Baldini was given a squad including star players such as Luca Toni or Gianluca Berti (which he brought with him from his past experience at Empoli).

In January 2004, following a 1–3 home defeat to Salernitana, Baldini criticized his chairman Zamparini for his words regarding the team's recent performances; he was subsequently fired, leaving Palermo in third place, and replaced by Francesco Guidolin who eventually guided the Sicilians to win the league title.

Serie A years: Parma and Lecce 
Baldini returned to coach in the 2004–05 season with Parma, being appointed at Renzo Ulivieri's place on September; he was however sacked himself in December 2004, leaving his side on second-last place in the Serie A table.

In September 2005, he was appointed as Lecce head coach, but was again fired in January 2006.

Catania 
In June 2007, he returned to Sicily after being named new Catania head coach.

On 26 August 2007, during the first league match, Baldini kicked the behind of Parma boss Domenico Di Carlo after being sent off and having engaged in a dispute with his opponent head coach. He consequently received a one-month ban due to his unprofessional behaviour. During his ban period, assistant coach Gianluca Atzori served at his place during games.

After a hard-fought match against Inter (nevertheless losing 2–0), Baldini decided to switch from his traditional 4-2-3-1 to a more practical 4-3-3 to better suit Catania's needs. In his first two successive matches since Inter, Catania played an honorable match against Fiorentina, despite losing 0–1 to the viola. In the next match, Catania achieved its first league victory, defeating relegation rival Empoli 1–0 thanks to a goal from Martinez. On September 30 his Catania side held Milan to an impressive 1–1 draw at the San Siro. He will return to the Catania bench against Livorno.

Despite criticism, Baldini initially managed to achieve a better league position than his predecessor Pasquale Marino, and also led his side to a historical qualification in the Coppa Italia 2007–08 semi-finals. However, a row of poor results quickly pushed Catania down to 18th place, being potentially relegated as of Week 31, and with only three points ahead of last-placed Empoli, persuading Baldini to resign from his post on 31 March 2008.

Return to Empoli, Vicenza and retirement 
In July 2008 he accepted to return at Empoli, accepting the managerial role for the freshly relegated Tuscan side in their 2008–09 Serie B campaign. He was however dismissed from his coaching post after failing to guide Empoli back to the top flight, following an unimpressive fifth place in the regular season and a successive defeat to Baldini's former club Brescia in the promotion playoff semi-finals.

After his farewell to Empoli, he left active football and worked as a pundit for sports channel Sportitalia.

On 13 June 2011 he was officially announced as new head coach of Serie B club Vicenza, signing a one-year contract with the Venetian club, but on October 4, 2011, he was sacked.  and replaced by Gigi Cagni.

Return to Carrarese 
After six years without a club, in June 2017 he accepted an offer to return at Carrarese; as part of the deal, he notably requested not to receive a salary.

After almost four years in charge of Carrarese, during which he consistently led the club to reaching the promotion playoffs, most prominently being eliminated in the semifinals by Bari in the 2019–20 season, Baldini resigned on 10 April 2021, following a fifth consecutive defeat in the Serie C league at the hands of AlbinoLeffe.

Return to Palermo 
On 24 December 2021, Baldini signed a contract until the end of the season with Serie C club Palermo, returning in charge of the Rosanero after his short-lived experience in the 2003–04 season.

Under his tenure, Baldini successfully turned the club's fortunes, also becoming a fan favourite due to his temper and his attitude toward the city, as well as changing the playing style into a more attacking one, making room for players such as Matteo Brunori (who eventually ended up becoming the top goalscorer in all Italian professional leagues with 29 goals) to shine. Palermo completed the 2021–22 Serie C Group C regular season in third place, thus qualifying to the promotion playoffs, where they defeated Triestina, Virtus Entella and Feralpisalò in the process, with all home games being attended by about 35,000 people, a stark change with respect to the rest of the season.

On 12 June 2022, following a 1–0 home win against Padova at a sold-out Stadio Renzo Barbera, Baldini's Palermo won the promotion playoffs and promotion to Serie B. On 27 July 2022, a few weeks after Palermo's promotion to Serie B and a club takeover by City Football Group, Baldini and director of football Renzo Castagnini announced their resignations from their respective roles at the club due to disagreements with the board. 

For his winning tenure as Palermo coach, in February 2023 Baldini was awarded the Golden Bench for best Serie C coach, a trophy he personally donated to the Palermo Museum shortly afterwards.

Perugia 
On 20 September 2022, Baldini returned into management as the new head coach of Serie B club Perugia, replacing Fabrizio Castori.

On 16 October 2022, following a 1–2 home loss against Südtirol, the third consecutive in all games in charge, Baldini announced his resignations with immediate effect.

Managerial statistics

Honours

Manager
Individual:
 Golden Bench - Serie C: 2021–22

References

External links
Coaching career (until 2003 
Profile updated to the year 2006 

Italian football managers
Serie A managers
Serie B managers
Empoli F.C. managers
A.C. ChievoVerona managers
A.C.N. Siena 1904 managers
Catania S.S.D. managers
Brescia Calcio managers
Palermo F.C. managers
Parma Calcio 1913 managers
U.S. Lecce managers
L.R. Vicenza managers
A.C. Perugia Calcio managers
Sportspeople from the Province of Massa-Carrara
1958 births
Living people
Footballers from Tuscany